Prospect Hill is a mountain in Dukes County, Massachusetts. Peaked Hill is located southeast of Prospect Hill.

References

Mountains of Massachusetts
Mountains of Dukes County, Massachusetts